The East Jerusalem Hospitals Network (EJHN) is a network of six hospitals in East Jerusalem. The network was founded in 1997 with the support of Palestinian politician Faisal Husseini. The network plays a crucial role in the Palestinian health care system.

The six hospitals

The six hospitals are as follows: 
 Augusta Victoria Hospital, As-Sawana (within At-Tur (Mount of Olives))
 Makassed Hospital, At-Tur (Mount of Olives)
 Saint John Eye Hospital Group, Sheikh Jarrah
 Red Crescent Maternity Hospital (also called Palestinian Red Crescent Society Hospital)
 Princess Basma Centre for Children with Disabilities
 St. Joseph's Hospital, Sheikh Jarrah, (run by the Sisters of St. Joseph of the Apparition)

Conferences
 First Annual Conference: Annual East Jerusalem Hospitals Conference: “Building a Network, Improving Patient Care”, 8–9 December 2011, in Jerusalem 
 Second Annual Conference: 2nd Annual East Jerusalem Hospitals Conference "Striving for Excellence Under Crisis", 30 January 2013, Jerusalem

Management
 Abdel-Qader Husseini, Chairman
 Walid Namour, Secretary General

References

 
Hospitals in Jerusalem
1997 establishments in the Palestinian territories